Michael Anthony Astaphan is a politician from Dominica Freedom Party. He was the political leader of the party from 5 August 2007 to 2008, and again from 2012 to 2017. 

He holds an undergraduate degree in Chemical Engineering from the University of New Brunswick, a master's degree in Management Engineering from the University of Connecticut in Bridgeport and a certificate in Planning, Public Administration and Project Management from the Hartford Institute of Public Administration. He led the Dominica Association of Industry and Commerce for a number of years.

References

Living people
University of New Brunswick alumni
University of Connecticut alumni
Dominica Freedom Party politicians
Year of birth missing (living people)